The Islamic State insurgency in Deir ez-Zor was a series of armed guerilla and insurgent attacks carried out by ISIL militants, following the defeat in the Deir ez-Zor campaign (2017–2019) against the Syrian Democratic Forces.

Timeline
November 13, 2019 – IS militants in Darnaj Dery Ez Zur claimed to have captured and summarily executed an SDF militiaman with a knife
November 13, 2019 – Deir Ezzor unknown gunmen attack one of the SDF military posts in the shaqra village in the western countryside
November 14, 2019 – Dier Ezzor SDF patrols closed all crossings in Shuhail with SDF deployed with all equipment for all combatants along the Euphrates river in Shuhail
November 14, 2019 – According to pro Assad media, fierce clashes have occurred between Syrian army forces and IS militants in a remote area near the T3 pump station in eastern Syrian Homs
November 19, 2019 – IS launches an attack against the positions of pro Assad forces outside the village of Shula south of the city of Deir Ezzor

References

Military operations of the Syrian civil war in 2019
Military operations of the Syrian civil war involving the Islamic State of Iraq and the Levant
Military operations of the Syrian civil war involving the Syrian Democratic Forces
Deir ez-Zor Governorate in the Syrian civil war